Alien vs. Predator (stylized as AVP: Alien vs. Predator) is a 2004 science fiction action film written and directed by Paul W. S. Anderson, and starring Sanaa Lathan, Raoul Bova, Lance Henriksen, Ewen Bremner, Colin Salmon, and Tommy Flanagan. It is the first film installment of the Alien vs. Predator franchise, adapting a crossover bringing together the eponymous creatures of the Alien and Predator series, a concept which originated in a 1989 comic book written by Randy Stradley and Chris Warner. Anderson wrote the story, with the creators of the Alien franchise, Dan O'Bannon and Ronald Shusett receiving additional story credit due to the incorporation of elements from the Alien series, and Anderson and Shane Salerno adapted the story into a screenplay. Their writing was influenced by Aztec mythology, the comic book series, and the writings of Erich von Däniken. In the film, scientists are caught in the crossfire of an ancient battle between Aliens and Predators as they attempt to escape a bygone pyramid.

Alien vs. Predator was theatrically released on 12 August 2004. It received generally negative reviews and grossed $177.4 million worldwide against a production budget of $60–70 million. A direct sequel, Aliens vs. Predator: Requiem, was released in 2007.

Plot

In 2004, a Predator ship arrives on Earth and uses a heating device to melt a hole in Antarctic ice. Wealthy industrialist Charles Weyland discovers through thermal imaging that there is a pyramid buried  beneath the ice. He assembles a team of experts to investigate, including archaeologists, linguists, mercenaries, and a mountaineering guide named Lex Woods. Terminally ill, Weyland desires to claim the discovery in his name.

When the team arrives at the abandoned whaling station, they find a newly made tunnel running directly beneath the ice toward the pyramid. The team descends the tunnel and begins to explore the pyramid, soon finding evidence of an ancient civilization and what appears to be a sacrificial chamber filled with human skeletons that all have ruptured rib cages.

Meanwhile, three Predators ⁠— Scar, Celtic, and Chopper ⁠— arrive and kill the remaining team members on the surface. They make their way down to the pyramid and arrive just as the team unwittingly activates the structure and is trapped within it. The Xenomorph Queen awakens from cryogenic stasis and begins to produce eggs. When the eggs hatch, several facehuggers attach themselves to humans trapped in the sacrificial chamber. Chestbursters emerge from the humans and quickly grow into adult Xenomorphs. The humans take possession of the Predator's blasters, and conflict erupts between the Predators, Xenomorphs, and humans. Celtic and Chopper are killed by a Xenomorph, and Weyland buys Lex and Sebastian De Rosa enough time to escape from Scar, giving his life in the process. The two witness Scar kill a facehugger and a Xenomorph before unmasking and marking himself with the acidic blood of the facehugger. After Lex and Sebastian leave, another facehugger attacks Scar.

Through translation of the pyramid's hieroglyphs, Lex and Sebastian learn that the Predators have been visiting Earth for thousands of years. They taught the early human civilization how to build pyramids and were worshipped as gods. Every 100 years, they visit Earth to take part in a rite of passage by which several humans sacrifice themselves as hosts for the Xenomorphs, creating the "ultimate prey" for the Predators to hunt. As a fail-safe, if overwhelmed, the Predators would activate a self-destruct device to eliminate the Xenomorphs. They deduce that the Predators lured them into the pyramid to use as a sacrifice.

Lex and Sebastian decide that the Predators must be allowed to succeed so that the Xenomorphs do not escape to the surface. Sebastian is captured by a Xenomorph, and Lex returns the blaster to Scar. They are attacked by a Xenomorph, and Lex manages to kill it. Impressed, Scar uses parts of a dead Xenomorph to fashion weapons for Lex, and the two form an alliance. Lex finds Sebastian, who has become the host of a Xenomorph. She mercy kills him, but the Xenomorph Queen is freed from her restraints and, along with the other Xenomorphs, begins pursuing Lex and Scar. Scar detaches and uses a bomb in his wrist module to destroy the pyramid and the remaining Xenomorphs and eggs. Lex and Scar reach the surface, and Scar uses acidic Xenomorph blood to mark Lex with the Xenomorph hunter symbol. However, the Xenomorph Queen reappears and attacks. They defeat the Queen by hooking her chains to a water tank and pushing her over a cliff, so that she sinks to the ocean floor under the tank's weight. Scar is fatally wounded.

A Predator spaceship appears, and its crew retrieves its fallen comrade. An elder Predator presents Lex with a spear as a gift as the spaceship departs. Lex walks over to a snowcat and leaves the area. On the Predator spaceship, Scar's body lies at rest when a Predalien chestburster erupts from his chest.

Cast

 Sanaa Lathan as Alexa "Lex" Woods, an experienced guide who spent several seasons exploring Arctic and Antarctic environments. She is loosely based on Machiko Noguchi from the self-titled quadrilogy.
 Raoul Bova as Professor Sebastian De Rosa, an Italian archaeologist and member of the exploration team who is able to translate the pyramid's hieroglyphs.
 Lance Henriksen as Charles Bishop Weyland, the billionaire head of Weyland Corporation and its subsidiary, Weyland Industries, who organizes the expedition.
 Ewen Bremner as Dr. Graeme Miller, a Scottish chemical engineer, the main scientist of the exploration team.
 Colin Salmon as Maxwell Stafford, assistant to Mr. Weyland and former British Special Forces officer.
 Tommy Flanagan as Mark Verheiden, a member of the armed escort that accompanies the exploration team.
 Carsten Norgaard as Rusten Quinn, head of the drilling team.
 Joseph Rye as Joe Connors, a member of the armed escort that accompanies the exploration team.
 Agathe de La Boulaye as Adele Rousseau, a member of the armed escort that accompanies the exploration team.
 Sam Troughton as Thomas Parks, the second archaeologist of the exploration team, De Rosa's assistant.
 Petr Jákl as Stone, a member of the armed escort that accompanies the exploration team.
 Liz May Brice as The Supervisor at the Nebraska satellite receiving station that detects the heat bloom in Antarctica.
 Karima Adebibe as a Sacrificial Maiden in the flashback to the ancient era.
 Tom Woodruff Jr. as The Alien / "Grid". The Alien played by Woodruff is listed in the film's credits as Grid, referencing crosshatch scars from Predator net constriction in the battle with the Predator called "Celtic".
 Ian Whyte as The Predator / "Scar", one of the three main Predators who come to Earth to create and hunt Aliens within the pyramid as a rite of passage. Whyte played the lead Predator, called Scar in the film's credits due to the Predator marking himself with the Alien's acidic blood. He is loosely based on Dachande from the self-titled quadrilogy.
 Whyte also played the other three Predators: "Chopper", "Celtic" and "Elder" (leader of the Predators at the end of the film).

Production

Fifth Alien film and sequel
Before 20th Century Fox gave Alien vs. Predator the greenlight, Aliens writer/director James Cameron had been working on a story for a fifth Alien film. Alien director Ridley Scott had talked with Cameron, stating "I think it would be a lot of fun, but the most important thing is to get the story right." In a 2002 interview, Scott's concept for a story was "to go back to where the alien creatures were first found and explain how they were created"; this project eventually became Scott's film Prometheus (2012). On learning that Fox intended to pursue Alien vs. Predator, Cameron believed the film would "kill the validity of the franchise" and ceased work on his story, "To me, that was Frankenstein Meets Werewolf. It was Universal just taking their assets and starting to play them off against each other...Milking it." After viewing Alien vs. Predator, Cameron remarked that "it was actually pretty good. I think of the five Alien films, I'd rate it third. I actually liked it. I actually liked it a lot." Conversely, Ridley Scott had no interest in the Alien vs. Predator films. When asked in May 2012 if he had watched them, Scott laughed, "No. I couldn't do that. I couldn't quite take that step." Director Neill Blomkamp would eventually go on to pitch his sequel to Aliens. However, Scott stated in 2017 that the project has been cancelled.

Development
The concept of Alien vs. Predator originated from the Aliens versus Predator comic book in 1989 and subsequent novelisations and novels. It was also hinted at when an Alien skull appeared in a trophy case aboard the Predator ship in Predator 2. Shortly after the release of Predator 2, Predator co-writer Jim Thomas discussed the possibilities of a Predator franchise and commented on the prospect of a crossover film, stating, "I think Predator vs. Alien is a good idea that will probably never happen". Screenwriter Peter Briggs created the original spec screenplay in 1990–1991, which was based on the first comic series. In 1991, he successfully pitched the concept to 20th Century Fox, who owned the film franchises, although the company did not move forward with the project until 2002; a video game produced by Capcom as a tie-in to the unmade film saw independent release in 1994. The project was delayed chiefly because the studio was working on Alien Resurrection. A draft penned by James DeMonaco and Kevin Fox described as "pretty much word-for-word like the Dark Horse comic book" was rejected by producer John Davis, who hoped to give the film an original approach by setting it on Earth.

As there were six producers between the film franchises, Predator producer John Davis had difficulty securing the rights as the producers were worried about a film featuring the two creatures. Paul W. S. Anderson pitched Davis a story he worked on for eight years, adapting the Machiko Noguchi series, and showed him concept art created by Randy Bowen. Impressed with Anderson's idea, Davis thought the story was like Jaws in that it "just drew you in, it drew you in". Anderson started to work on the film after completing the script for Resident Evil: Apocalypse, with Shane Salerno co-writing. Salerno spent six months writing the shooting script, finished its development, and stayed on for revisions throughout the film's production. Dan O'Bannon and Ronald Shusett received story credit on the film based on elements from their work on the original Alien.

Story and setting

Early reports claimed the story was about humans who tried to lure Predators with Alien eggs, although the idea was scrapped. Influenced by the work of Erich von Däniken, Anderson researched von Däniken's theories on how he believed early civilizations were able to construct massive pyramids with the help of aliens, an idea long debunked and based on misinterpretations of Aztec mythology. Anderson wove these ideas into Alien vs. Predator, describing a scenario in which Predators taught ancient humans to build pyramids and used Earth for rite of passage rituals every 100 years in which they would hunt Aliens. To explain how these ancient civilisations "disappeared without a trace", Anderson came up with the idea that the Predators, if overwhelmed by the Aliens, would use their self-destruct weapons to kill everything in the area. H. P. Lovecraft's novella At the Mountains of Madness (1931) served as an inspiration for the film, and several elements of the Aliens vs. Predator comic series were included. Anderson's initial script called for five Predators to appear in the film, although the number was later reduced to three.

As Alien vs. Predator was intended to be a sequel to the Predator films and prequel to the Alien series, Anderson was cautious of contradicting continuity in the franchises. He chose to set the film on the remote Norwegian Antarctic island of Bouvet commenting, "It's definitely the most hostile environment on Earth and probably the closest to an Alien surface you can get." Anderson thought that setting the film in an urban environment like New York City would break continuity with the Alien series as the protagonist, Ellen Ripley, had no knowledge the creatures existed. "You can't have an Alien running around the city now, because it would've been written up and everyone will know about it. So there's nothing in this movie that contradicts anything that already exists."

Casting

The first actor to be cast for Alien vs. Predator was Lance Henriksen, who played the character Bishop in Aliens and Alien 3. Although the Alien films are set hundreds of years in the future, Anderson wanted to keep continuity with the series by including a familiar actor. Henriksen plays billionaire and self-taught-engineer Charles Bishop Weyland, a character that ties in with the Weyland-Yutani Corporation as the original founder and CEO of Weyland Industries. According to Anderson, Weyland becomes known for the discovery of the pyramid, and as a result the Weyland-Yutani Corporation models the Bishop android in the Alien films after him; "when the Bishop android is created in 150 years time, it's created with the face of the creator. It's kind of like Microsoft building an android in 100 years time that has the face of Bill Gates."

Anderson opted for a European cast including Italian actor Raoul Bova, Ewen Bremner from Scotland, and English actor Colin Salmon. Producer Davis said, "There's a truly international flavor to the cast, and gives the film a lot of character." Several hundred actresses attended the auditions to be cast as the film's heroine Alexa Woods, loosely based on the comic and novel protagonist Machiko Noguchi. Sanaa Lathan was selected, and one week later she flew to Prague to begin filming. The filmmakers knew there would be comparisons to Alien heroine Ellen Ripley and did not want a clone of the character, but wanted to make her similar while adding something different.

Anderson reported in an interview that California Governor Arnold Schwarzenegger was willing to reprise his role as Major Alan "Dutch" Schaeffer from Predator in a short cameo appearance if he lost the recall election on condition that the filming should take place at his residence. Schwarzenegger, however, won the election with 48.58% of the votes and was unavailable to participate in Alien vs. Predator. Actress Sigourney Weaver, who starred as Ellen Ripley in the Alien series, said she was happy not to be in the film, as a possible crossover was "the reason I wanted my character to die in the first place", and thought the concept "sounded awful".

Filming and set designs
Production began in late 2003 at Barrandov Studios in Prague, Czech Republic, where most of the filming took place. Production designer Richard Bridgland was in charge of sets, props and vehicles, based on early concept art Anderson had created to give a broad direction of how things would look. 25 to 30 life-sized sets were constructed at Barrandov Studios, many of which were interiors of the pyramid. The pyramid's carvings, sculptures, and hieroglyphs were influenced by Egyptian, Cambodian, and Aztec civilisations, while the regular shifting of the pyramid's rooms was meant to evoke a sense of claustrophobia similar to the original Alien film. According to Anderson, if he was to build the sets in Los Angeles they would have cost $20 million. However, in Prague they cost $2 million, an important factor when the film's budget was less than $50 million.

Third scale miniatures several meters in height were created to give the film the effect of realism, rather than relying on computer generated imagery (CGI). For the whaling station miniatures and life-sized sets, over 700 bags of artificial snow were used (roughly 15–20 tons). A 4.5-meter miniature of an icebreaker with working lights and a mechanical moving radar was created, costing almost $37,000 and taking 10 weeks to create. Visual effects producer Arthur Windus, claimed miniatures were beneficial in the filming process: "With computer graphics, you need to spend a lot of time making it real. With a miniature, you shoot it and its there." A scale 25-meter miniature of the whaling station was created in several months. It was designed so the model could be collapsed and then reconstructed, which proved beneficial for a six-second shot which required a re-shoot.

Effects and creatures

Special effects company Amalgamated Dynamics Incorporated (ADI) was hired for the film, having previously worked on Alien 3 and Alien Resurrection. Visual special effects producers Arthur Windus and John Bruno were in charge of the project, which contained 400 effects shots. ADI founders Alec Gillis, Tom Woodruff Jr. and members of their company, began designing costumes, miniatures and effects in June 2003. For five months the creatures were redesigned, the Predators wrist blades being extended roughly four times longer than those in the Predator films, and a larger mechanical plasma caster was created for the Scar Predator.

The basic shape of the Predator mask was kept, although technical details were added and each Predator was given a unique mask to distinguish them from each other. These masks were created using clay, which was used to form moulds to create fiberglass copies. These copies were painted to give a weathered look, which Woodruff claims "is what the Predator is all about". A hydraulic Alien puppet was created so ADI would be able to make movements faster and give the Alien a "slimline and skeletal" appearance, rather than using an actor in a suit. The puppet required six people to run it; one for the head and body, two for the arms, and a sixth to make sure the signals were reaching the computer. Movements were recorded in the computer so that puppeteers would be able to repeat moves that Anderson liked. The puppet was used in six shots, including the fight scene with the Predator which took one month to film.

The crew tried to keep CGI use to a minimum, as Anderson said people in suits and puppets are scarier than CGI monsters as they are "there in the frame". Roughly 70% of scenes were created using suits, puppets, and miniatures. The Alien queen was filmed using three variations: a 4.8-meter practical version, a 1.2-meter puppet, and a computer-generated version. The practical version required 12 puppeteers to operate, and CGI tails were added to the Aliens and the queen as they were difficult to animate using puppetry. The queen alien's inner-mouth was automated though, and was powered by a system of hydraulics. Anderson praised Alien director Ridley Scott's and Predator director John McTiernan's abilities at building suspense by not showing the creatures until late in the film, something Anderson wanted to accomplish with Alien vs. Predator. "Yes, we make you wait 45 minutes, but once it goes off, from there until the end of the movie, it's fucking relentless".

Music

Austrian composer Harald Kloser was hired to create the film's score. After completing the score for The Day After Tomorrow, Kloser was chosen by Anderson as he is a fan of the franchises. It was recorded in London, and was primarily orchestral as Anderson commented, "this is a terrifying movie and it needs a terrifying, classic movie score to go with it; at the same time it's got huge action so it needs that kind of proper orchestral support."

The score album was released on iTunes on 9 August 2004, and on CD on 31 August 2004 and received mixed reviews. James Christopher Monger of Allmusic thought Kloser introduced electronic elements well, and called "Alien vs. Predator Main Theme a particularly striking and serves as a continuous creative source for the composer to dip his baton in." Mike Brennan of Soundtrack, however, said it "lacks the ingenuity of the previous trilogy (Alien) and the Predator scores, which all shared a strong sense of rhythm in place of thematic content. Kloser throws in some interesting percussion cues ("Antarctica" and "Down the Tunnel"), but more as a sound effect than a consistent motif." John Fallon of JoBlo.com compared it to character development in the film, "too generic to completely engage or leave a permanent impression."

Release

Home media
Alien vs. Predator was released on VHS, DVD, and PSP UMD Movies in North America on 25 January 2005. The DVD contained two audio commentaries. The first featured Paul W. S. Anderson, Lance Henriksen, and Sanaa Lathan, while the second included special effects supervisor John Bruno and ADI founders Alec Gillis and Tom Woodruff. A 25-minute "Making of" featurette and a Dark Horse AVP comic cover gallery were included in the special features along with three deleted scenes from the film. On release, Alien vs. Predator debuted at number 1 on the Top DVD Sales and Top Video Rental charts in North America.

A two-disc "Extreme Edition" was released on 7 March 2005, featuring behind the scenes footage of the conception, pre-production, production, post-production, and licensing of the film. An "Unrated Edition" was released on 22 November 2005, containing the same special features as the Extreme Edition as well as an extra eight minutes of footage in the film. John J. Puccio of DVD Town remarked that the extra footage contained "a few more shots of blood, gore, guts, and slime to spice things up...and tiny bits of connecting matter to help us follow the story line better, but none of it amounts to much."

Reception

Box office
Alien vs. Predator was released in North America on 13 August 2004 in 3,395 theatres. The film grossed $38.2 million over its opening weekend for an average of $11,278 per theatre, and was number one at the box office. The film spent 16 weeks in cinemas and made $80,282,231 in North America. It grossed $9 million in the United Kingdom, $16 million in Japan, and $8 million in Germany and totalled $97,144,859 at the international box office. This brought the film's worldwide gross to $177,427,090, making it the second highest-grossing film in either the Predator or Alien franchises, behind Prometheus, which grossed over $403 million worldwide. It ranks third behind Aliens and Prometheus at the domestic box office.

Critical response
 On Metacritic the film has a weighted average score of 29 out of 100, based on 21 critics, indicating "generally unfavorable reviews". Audiences polled by CinemaScore gave the film an average grade of "B" on an A+ to F scale.

Rick Kisonak of Film Threat praised the film stating, "For a big dumb production about a movie monster smackdown, Alien vs. Predator is a surprisingly good time". Ian Grey of the Orlando Weekly felt, "Anderson clearly relished making this wonderful, utterly silly film; his heart shows in every drip of slime." Staci Layne Wilson of Horror.com called it "a pretty movie to look at with its grandiose sets and top notch creature FX, but it's a lot like Anderson's previous works in that it's all facade and no foundation." Gary Dowell of The Dallas Morning News called the film, "a transparent attempt to jumpstart two run-down franchises". Ed Halter of The Village Voice described the film's lighting for fight sequences as, "black-on-black-in-blackness", while Ty Burr of The Boston Globe felt the lighting "left the audience in the dark".

Other media

Sequel

A sequel titled Aliens vs. Predator: Requiem was released in December 2007.

Related film

A fourth Predator film, titled The Predator, was released in September 2018, featuring Lex Wood's Xenomorph-bone spear from the conclusion of Alien vs. Predator on display at Project Stargazer.

Related video games

See also

 Alien franchise
 Predator franchise
 List of action films of the 2000s
 List of horror films of 2004
 List of science-fiction films of the 2000s

References

External links

 
  
 
 
 
 
 Alien vs. Predator Central

2004 films
20th Century Fox films
Alien vs. Predator (franchise) films
American science fiction action films
2000s science fiction horror films
2004 action thriller films
2000s monster movies
2000s English-language films
English-language Canadian films
English-language Czech films
English-language German films
American action adventure films
American sequel films
Films about ancient astronauts
Bouvet Island
British science fiction action films
Canadian science fiction action films
Czech science fiction action films
Davis Entertainment films
Films based on Dark Horse Comics
Films directed by Paul W. S. Anderson
Films produced by John Davis
Films scored by Harald Kloser
Films set in 2004
Films set in Antarctica
Films set in Cambodia
Films set in New Mexico
Films set in Nepal
Films set in Nebraska
Films shot in the Czech Republic
Fiction set in the 4th millennium BC
Prequel films
Interquel films
Horror crossover films
American crossover films
Films about invisibility
Films with screenplays by Paul W. S. Anderson
Stillking Films films
Films produced by Gordon Carroll
Films produced by Walter Hill
Brandywine Productions films
Films about extraterrestrial life
Films with screenplays by Ronald Shusett
Films with screenplays by Dan O'Bannon
2000s American films
2000s Canadian films
2000s British films
American prequel films
British prequel films
Czech prequel films
German prequel films
Czech crossover films